There are many outdoor sculptures in Washington, D.C. In addition to the capital's most famous monuments and memorials, many figures recognized as national heroes (either in government or military) have been posthumously awarded with his or her own statue in a park or public square. Some figures appear on several statues: Abraham Lincoln, for example, has at least three likenesses, including those at the Lincoln Memorial, in Lincoln Park, and the old Superior Court of the District of Columbia. A number of international figures, such as Mohandas Gandhi, have also been immortalized with statues. The Statue of Freedom is a 19½-foot (5.9 m) tall allegorical statue that rests atop the United States Capitol dome.

In addition to the human likenesses, a number of public and private sculptures of animals, objects, and abstractions are spread throughout the city. Two museums on the National Mall include sculpture gardens: the Hirshhorn Museum and Sculpture Garden and the National Gallery of Art.

Statues of historical figures
 Archer Alexander at Lincoln Park
 Dante Alighieri in Meridian Hill Park
 José Artigas at 18th Street and Constitution Avenue NW
 Francis Asbury at 16th and Mount Pleasant Streets NW
 Mustafa Kemal Atatürk at the Turkish Embassy, 2525 Massachusetts Avenue NW
 Marion Barry in front of the John A. Wilson Building, 1350 Pennsylvania Avenue NW
 John Barry at Franklin Square
 Saint Bernadette at the Franciscan Monastery at 14th and Quincy Streets NE
 Mary McLeod Bethune Memorial at Lincoln Park
 Sir William Blackstone at Third Street and Constitution Avenue NW
 Equestrian of Simón Bolívar at 18th and C Streets and Virginia Avenue NW
 Simon Bolivar, Libertador at the Organization of American States, 17th Street and Constitution Avenue NW
 Chuck Brown Memorial at Langdon Park, 2900 block of 23rd Street NE
 James Buchanan at Meridian Hill Park
 Edmund Burke at 11th Street and Massachusetts Avenue NW
John Carroll at 38th and Q Streets NW
 Saint Christopher at the Franciscan Monastery at 14th and Quincy Streets NE
 Winston Churchill at the British Embassy, 3100 Massachusetts Avenue NW
 Christopher Columbus at Holy Rosary Church, 595 Third Street NW
 Columbus Statue at Columbus Circle
 Sor Juana Inés de la Cruz at the Organization of American States, 17th Street and Constitution Avenue NW
 Louis Daguerre at Seventh and F Streets NW
 Jane Delano at 18th and E Streets NW
 William O. Douglas at 30th and Canal Streets NW
 Albert Einstein at the Albert Einstein Memorial, 21st Street and Constitution Avenue NW
 Duke Ellington at T Street and Florida Avenue NW
 Robert Emmet at 24th Street and Massachusetts Avenue NW
 John Ericsson at Ohio Drive and Independence Avenue SW
 David G. Farragut at Farragut Square NW
 Saint Francis of Assisi at the Franciscan Monastery at 14th and Quincy Streets NE
 Benjamin Franklin at 11th Street and Pennsylvania Avenue NW
 Albert Gallatin at the U.S. Treasury Building's North Portico
 Edward Miner Gallaudet at Gallaudet University
 Thomas Hopkins Gallaudet at Gallaudet University
 Bernardo de Gálvez at 22nd Street and Virginia Avenue NW
 Mahatma Gandhi Memorial at 21st and Q Streets and Massachusetts Avenue NW
 James A. Garfield at Garfield Circle
 Cardinal James Gibbons at 16th Street and Park Road NW
 Gibran Khalil Gibran on Massachusetts Ave NW
 Josh Gibson at Nationals Park
 Samuel Gompers at 10th Street and Massachusetts Avenue NW
 Ulysses S. Grant on the National Mall
 Nathanael Greene in Stanton Park NE
 Théodore Guérin on the grounds of the Basilica of the National Shrine of the Immaculate Conception
 Samuel Hahnemann at 16th Street and Massachusetts Avenue NW
 Nathan Hale at Ninth Street and Constitution Avenue NW
 Alexander Hamilton at the U.S. Treasury Building's South Portico
 Winfield Scott Hancock at Seventh Street and Pennsylvania Avenue NW
 Joseph Henry at 10th Street and Jefferson Drive NW
 Frank Howard at Nationals Park
 Cordell Hull at the Organization of American States, 17th Street and Constitution Avenue NW
 Queen Isabella of Spain at the Organization of American States, 17th Street and Constitution Avenue NW
 Andrew Jackson at Lafayette Square NW
 Philip Jaisohn at the Korean Consulate on Sheridan Circle
 Thomas Jefferson at the Jefferson Memorial
 Saint Jerome at the Croatian Embassy, 24th Street and Massachusetts Avenue NW
 Joan of Arc in Meridian Hill Park
 Pope John Paul II at the Pope John Paul II Cultural Center, 3900 Harewood Road NE
 Walter Johnson at Nationals Park
 John Paul Jones at the John Paul Jones Memorial at 17th Street and Independence Avenue SW
 Benito Juárez at Virginia and New Hampshire Avenues NW
 Francis Scott Key at 36th and M Street NW
 Martin Luther King Jr. at the Martin Luther King Jr. Memorial in West Potomac Park, adjacent to the National Mall
 Tadeusz Kościuszko at Lafayette Square NW
 Michael Kováts de Fabricy at the Hungarian Embassy, 3910 Shoemaker Street NW
 Marquis Gilbert de Lafayette at Lafayette Square NW
 Abraham Lincoln at the Lincoln Memorial
 Abraham Lincoln at Lincoln Park
 Abraham Lincoln at Fourth and D Streets NW
 Abraham Lincoln at President Lincoln's Cottage at the Soldiers' Home at Upshur Street and Rock Creek Church Road NW
 Major General John A. Logan at Logan Circle NW
 Henry Wadsworth Longfellow at M Street and Connecticut Avenue NW
 Martin Luther at 14th Street and Massachusetts Avenue NW
Nelson Mandela at the Embassy of South Africa
 Guglielmo Marconi at 16th and Lamont Streets NW
 John Marshall at Fourth Street and Constitution Avenue NW
 Crown Princess Märtha, Norwegian Embassy
 Mary, Protector of Faith on the grounds of the Basilica of the National Shrine of the Immaculate Conception
 Tomáš Garrigue Masaryk at 22nd Street and Massachusetts Avenue NW
 George Mason at the George Mason Memorial in East Potomac Park
 George B. McClellan at Connecticut Avenue and Columbia Road NW
 James B. McPherson at McPherson Square NW
 George Meade at 3rd Street and Pennsylvania Avenue NW
 Saint Michael at the Franciscan Monastery at 14th and Quincy Streets NE
 Peter Muhlenberg at Muhlenberg Park, Connecticut Avenue and Ellicott Street NW
 Pablo Neruda at the Organization of American States, 17th Street and Constitution Avenue NW
 Teresa de la Parra at the Organization of American States, 17th Street and Constitution Avenue NW
 John Pershing at 14th Street and Pennsylvania Avenue NW
 Albert Pike at Third and D Streets NW
 Count Casimir Pulaski at 13th Street and Pennsylvania Avenue NW
 Alexander Pushkin at 22nd and H Streets NW
 John A. Rawlins at 18th and E Streets NW
 Comte Jean de Rochambeau at Lafayette Square NW
 Eleanor Roosevelt in Room 4 of the Franklin Delano Roosevelt Memorial
 Eleanor Roosevelt at the Washington National Cathedral, Massachusetts and Wisconsin Avenues NW
 Franklin D. Roosevelt in Room 1 of the Franklin Delano Roosevelt Memorial
 Franklin D. Roosevelt in Room 3 of the Franklin Delano Roosevelt Memorial
 Theodore Roosevelt on Theodore Roosevelt Island
 Father Godfrey Schilling at the Franciscan Monastery at 14th and Quincy Streets NE
 Winfield Scott at Scott Circle NW
 Olive Risley Seward at Sixth Street and North Carolina Avenue NE
 Alexander Robey Shepherd at 1350 Pennsylvania Avenue NW
 Philip Sheridan at Sheridan Circle NW
 William Tecumseh Sherman at 15th and E Streets NW
 Taras Shevchenko at 22nd and P Streets NW
 Friedrich Wilhelm von Steuben at Lafayette Square NW
 Robert A. Taft at the Robert A. Taft Memorial, 1st Street and Constitution Avenue NW
 George Henry Thomas at Thomas Circle NW
 José Cecilio del Valle at the Organization of American States, 17th Street and Constitution Avenue NW
 Artemas Ward at Ward Circle NW
 George Washington at Washington Circle NW
 George Washington at 20th and H Street NW
 George Washington at the Washington National Cathedral, Cathedral Drive and Wisconsin Avenue NW
 Daniel Webster Memorial at 16th Street and Massachusetts Avenue NW
 John Wesley at Wesley Theological Seminary, 4500 Massachusetts NW
 John Witherspoon at N Street and Connecticut Avenue NW
 Carter G. Woodson at 9th Street and Rhode Island Avenue NW

Other outdoor sculpture in D.C.

 Boy Scout Memorial on the Ellipse
 The Burghers of Calais by Auguste Rodin at The Hirshhorn Sculpture Garden
 Civil War Nurses (aka Nuns of the Battlefield) at M Street and Rhode Island Avenue NW
 Crouching Woman by Rodin at The Hirshhorn Sculpture Garden
 Dupont Circle Fountain at Dupont Circle NW
 First Division Monument at State Place and 17th Street NW
 The Founders of the Daughters of the American Revolution at 18th and C Streets NW
 Heritage and Guardianship by James Earle Fraser at the National Archives Building on Constitution Avenue between 7th and 9th Streets NW
 Holodomor Memorial at Massachusetts Avenue and North Capitol Streets NW
 Man Controlling Trade by Michael Lantz at Federal Trade Commission headquarters at Pennsylvania Avenue and 6th Streets NW
 Andrew W. Mellon Memorial Fountain at Constitution Ave & Pennsylvania Ave.
 The Court of Neptune Fountain by Roland Hinton Perry in front of the Library of Congress's Thomas Jefferson Building on 1st Street SE
 Peace Monument in Peace Circle on the Capitol Grounds, at Pennsylvania Avenue and 1st Street NW
 Red Cross Men and Women Killed in Service Memorial in garden of Red Cross National Headquarters, 1730 E Street NW
 Second Division Memorial at 17th Street and Constitution Avenue NW
 She Who Must Be Obeyed by Tony Smith at the Frances Perkins Building
 The Spirit of Haida Gwaii by Bill Reid at the Canadian Embassy
 The Three Soldiers by Frederick Hart at the Vietnam Veterans Memorial in Constitution Gardens on Constitution Avenue NW
 Transformers by an unknown artist stands in front of a house on Prospect Street NW in Georgetown
 Women's Titanic Memorial, 5th & P Street SW

See also
 List of public art in Washington, D.C.
 The Awakening, installed for 27 years at Hains Point in East Potomac Park, was moved in 2008 to National Harbor, Maryland
 National Statuary Hall

References

 James M. Goode, The Outdoor Sculpture of Washington, D.C. (1974)
 Washington D.C. Memorials, a directory of memorials, monuments, statues & other outdoor art in Washington, D.C.

External links